Striker is a 1996 association football video game developed by Rage Software and published by Acclaim Entertainment for the Saturn. It was also released for the PlayStation and DOS.

Gameplay
Striker was the only soccer video game at the time that featured five-on-five play for both indoor and outdoor soccer matches. Commentary is provided by Andy Gray.

Reception
Next Generation reviewed the Saturn version of the game, rating it one star out of five, and stated that "Frankly, there are far too many good soccer games on store shelves to even think about Striker as an option."

GameSpot gave the PC version of the game 7.4/10

Reviews
PC Gamer (1996 December)
GameFan (May, 1996)
PC Games - Nov, 1996

References

1996 video games
Acclaim Entertainment games
Association football video games
DOS games
PlayStation (console) games
Rage Games games
Sega Saturn games
Video games developed in the United Kingdom
Windows games